Nika Babnik (born 17 September 1998) is a Slovenian footballer who plays as a forward for Sammarinese-based Italian Serie A club San Marino Academy and the Slovenia women's national team.

References

External links

1998 births
Living people
People from Brežice
Slovenian women's footballers
Women's association football forwards
ŽNK Krka players
U.P.C. Tavagnacco players
San Marino Academy players
Serie A (women's football) players
Slovenia women's international footballers
Slovenian expatriate footballers
Slovenian expatriate sportspeople in Italy
Expatriate women's footballers in Italy
Slovenian expatriates in San Marino
Expatriate footballers in San Marino